Subgenus Limniris is one subgenus of beardless irises, which don't have hair on their drooping sepals, also called their falls.

'Limniris' is derived from the Latin for marsh or living-in-lakes iris, or pond iris. This refers to the fact that most species can be grown in moist habitats for part of the year.

It was originally described by Tausch in Deut. Bot. Herb.-Buch (Deutsche Botaniker) in 1841. Édouard Spach made changes 1846 in Ann. Sci. Nat., Bot. (Annales des Sciences Naturelles; Botanique).

It was divided into sections, 'Limniris', which is further divided down to about 16 series, and 'Lophiris' (also known as 'Evansias' or crested iris). They are both polyphyletic.
It has 45 species, which are widely distributed in the Northern Hemisphere.

It is a group that has been recognized with few changes since Dykes's 1913 monograph on the genus Iris. Lawrence (1953), Rodionenko (1987) and then Mathew (1989) all tried to modify the group.
  
Various authors have tried to classify the list in various ways. It is still undergoing study and variations.

Taxonomy

Section Limniris
(going alphabetically)

Section Limniris (going in alphabetical order)

Series Californicae  Pacific Coast irises 
Iris bracteata – Siskiyou iris
Iris chrysophylla – Yellow-leaved iris
Iris douglasiana – Douglas iris
Iris fernaldii – Fernald's iris
Iris hartwegii – Hartweg's iris, rainbow iris, Sierra iris
Iris innominata – Del Norte iris
Iris macrosiphon – Bowltube iris
Iris munzii – Munz's iris, Tulare lavender iris
Iris purdyi – Purdy's iris
Iris tenax – Tough-leaved iris, Oregon iris
Iris tenuissima  Dykes – (Long-tubed iris)

Series Chinenses (from east Asia) 
Iris henryi Baker
Iris koreana Nakai
Iris minutoaurea Makino
Iris odaesanensis Y.N.Lee
Iris proantha Diels
Iris rossii Baker 
Iris speculatrix Hance

Series Ensatae 
Iris lactea Pall.

Series Foetidissimae 
Iris foetidissima L. – Stinking iris, Gladwin iris, stinking gladwin, gladdon, roast-beef plant

Series Hexagonae 
(known as the Louisiana irises)
Iris brevicaulis Raf. – Zigzag iris
Iris fulva Ker-Gawl. – Copper iris
Iris giganticaerulea – Giant blue iris, giant blue flag
Iris hexagona Walt. – Dixie iris
Iris nelsonii  Randolph – (Abbeville iris)
Iris savannarum Small – Prairie iris

Series Laevigatae 
(which includes the Japanese irises) 
Iris ensata Thunb. – Japanese iris, hanashōbu (Japanese) (including I. kaempferi)
Iris laevigata Fisch – Rabbitear iris, shallow-flowered iris, kakitsubata (Japanese)
Iris maackii Maxim.
Iris pseudacorus L. – Yellow iris, yellow flag
Iris versicolor L. – Larger blue flag, harlequin blueflag
Iris virginica L. – Virginia iris

Series Longipetalae 
(Rocky Mountain or long-petaled iris) 
Iris longipetala Herb. – (Coast iris)
Iris missouriensis  – Rocky Mountain iris, Western blue flag

Series Prismaticae 
(contains just one species from America) 
Iris prismatica Pursh ex Ker-Gawl. – (Slender blue flag)

Series Ruthenicae
Iris ruthenica Ker-Gawl.
Iris uniflora Pall.

Series Sibiricae
(Siberian irises) 
Iris bulleyana Dykes
Iris chrysographes – Black iris
Iris clarkei Baker
Iris delavayi Micheli
Iris forrestii Dykes
Iris sanguinea Hornem. ex Donn – Blood iris, ayame (Japanese)
Iris sibirica – Siberian iris
Iris typhifolia Kitag.
Iris wilsonii C.H.Wright

Series Spuriae
Iris brandzae Prod.
Iris crocea  Jacquem. ex R.C.Foster (including I. aurea)
Iris graminea L.
Iris halophila Pall.
Iris halophila var. sogdiana (Bunge) Grubov
Iris kerneriana Asch. & Sint.
Iris ludwigii Maxim.
Iris notha M.Bieb.
Iris orientalis Mill. – (Yellow-banded iris)
Iris pontica  Zapal.
Iris pseudonotha Galushko
Iris sintenisii  Janka
Iris spuria – Blue iris
Iris spuria subsp. carthaliniae  (Fomin) B.Mathew 
Iris spuria subsp. demetrii  (Achv. & Mirzoeva) B.Mathew 
Iris spuria subsp. maritima (Dykes) P.Fourn. 
Iris spuria subsp. musulmanica  (Fomin) Takht. 
Iris xanthospuria B.Mathew & T.Baytop

Series Syriacae
(species with swollen leaf bases and spiney bristles) 
Iris grant-duffii Baker
Iris masia Foster

Series Tenuifoliae
(mostly semi-desert plants) 
Iris anguifuga Y.T.Zhao & X.J.Xue
Iris bungei Maxim.
Iris cathayensis Migo
Iris farreri Dykes
Iris kobayashii Kitag.
Iris loczyi Kanitz
Iris qinghainica Y.T.Zhao
Iris songarica Schrenk
Iris tenuifolia Pall.
Iris ventricosa Pall.

Series Tripetalae 
(mostly having three petals)  
Iris hookeri Penny – (Hooker's iris)
Iris setosa Pallas ex Link – (Beachhead iris)
Iris tridentata Pursh – (Savanna iris)

Series Unguiculares
Iris lazica Albov
Iris unguicularis Poir.

Series Vernae
(contains just one species from America) 
Iris verna L. – Dwarf violet iris

Section Lophiris
Otherwise known as 'Evansias' or crested iris.

Iris confusa
Iris cristata
Iris formosana 
Iris japonica
Iris lacustris
Iris latistyla
Iris milesii
Iris subdichotoma
Iris tectorum (Wall iris)
Iris tenuis (Clackamas iris)
Iris wattii

References

Sources
 The Iris, by Brian Mathew, Batsford, 1989, 256 pages, 38 colour photos, 32 b/w photos, 16 illustrations,

External list
Clark University's classification of Iris

Iris (plant)
Plant subgenera